Nikolaj Muster (22 November 1925 – 7 May 2018), known as Miki Muster, was a Slovenian academic sculptor, illustrator, cartoonist, and animator. He is viewed as a pioneer in the field of comics and animation in Slovenia, known for the series of comics featuring the characters Zvitorepec, Trdonja, and Lakotnik, and animated TV commercials.

Biography
Muster first got interested in animation when he saw Disney's Snow White and the Seven Dwarfs. He graduated from the Academy of Fine Arts, University of Ljubljana, with a degree in sculpture. Even during the studies, he wished to join the Disney studios in the US, which was impossible given the post-war political situation. After completing only a couple of statues, he focused on drawing. 

In 1952, Muster started drawing his comic strip Zvitorepec, which was running in magazines Poletove podobe in povesti (PPP) and Tedenska tribuna. PPP was supposed to publish Disney's comics but as they did not arrive in time, Muster filled in with his own one. From 1955 to 1973, he was drawing for Slovenski poročevalec, later renamed Delo; after that he worked as a freelancer. His work in comics was frowned upon by the Communist Yugoslav government, with socialist realism being the preferred art style and anything too Western undesirable. This attitude continued to some degree even after the Tito–Stalin Split.

In 1973, Muster moved to Munich to pursue a career in animation at Bavaria Film. After Slovenia declared independence, Muster returned home and was for some time drawing caricatures for political magazines Mag and Reporter. 

For his work, Muster received a series of awards. In 2014, the Journalist's Associacion of Slovenia awarded him the Borut Meško Award for his achievements in illustration and caricature. Also in 2014, he was awarded the silver order of merit for his pioneering work in the field of comics and animation by the President of Slovenia Borut Pahor. In 2015 he received the Prešeren Award for lifetime achievements, the highest Slovenian award for arts. In 2015 he was awarded an honorary doctorate at the University of Nova Gorica.

Muster died on 7 May 2018 in a nursing home in Notranje Gorice, aged 92.

Work
Muster was best known for his comic books featuring the characters Zvitorepec, Trdonja, and Lakotnik; an anthropomorphic plucky fox, a wise turtle, and an always-hungry simple-minded wolf. The characters were taken from Slovenian folklore. In a series of volumes, the adventures of the trio took place worldwide, in different historic periods, most notably in the Wild West, in future, and even in space. The episode in space from 1959 caused a minor political incident: the Russian cosmonauts that the trio meets on the trip to the Moon were depicted as bears. The Soviet embassy in Belgrade issued an official protest. In order to resolve the problem, the next volume depicted American astronauts as monkeys, which pleased the Russians (while not bothering the US, where the comics were not published anyway). Some stories outlined real-world problems such as increasing pollution and aggressive driving, while a story about Lakotnik building his own house made fun of the construction process in Yugoslavia in the 1960s. Although some contemporaries criticized Muster's style as "too American" and "too Disneyesque", he was nevertheless recognized for his artistic talent. The comics were immensely popular with children and teenagers and remained a mainstay of newspapers and book collections for decades.

Muster's other illustrations and comics include stories about Neewa the Bear, Lupinica, Snežko, The Last of the Mohicans, Ostrostrelec, Stezosledec, and others.

He was also well-known for his work in animation, especially for TV commercials. Among his best-known works were the Cikcak bunnies and commercials for Mercator, Čunga Lunga chewing gum, and Viki krema. While in Munich, Muster collaborated with the Argentinian cartoonist Guillermo Mordillo, creating about 400 of shorts based on his characters. He also worked on the animated adventures of German private detective Nick Knatterton.

References

External links
 
 Kar sem si želel kot mulc, sem uresničil (interview) ("I Made My Boyhood Ambition Come True"; Dnevnik, 9 June 2007)
 Miki Muster: Packanje z barvami mi ni všeč (interview) ("I Don't Like Mucking About With Colours"; Dnevnik, 7 February 2015)

1925 births
2018 deaths
20th-century Slovenian sculptors
20th-century Slovenian male artists
Slovenian illustrators
Slovenian cartoonists
Slovenian animators
Slovenian comics artists
People from Murska Sobota
University of Ljubljana alumni
Prešeren Award laureates